Beatnuts Forever is the second of three greatest hits albums by hip hop group The Beatnuts. It was released by Relativity Records in 2001 shortly after the release of Take It or Squeeze It. It contains songs from The Beatnuts' first four albums, as well as its two EP's. It most heavily borrows from Take It or Squeeze It and least heavily from The Beatnuts: Street Level. The album does not feature the song "Beatnuts Forever", and only contains one exclusive Beatnuts track, "Intro". All of its songs are produced by The Beatnuts. Beatnuts Forever did not chart upon release, and is currently out of print and rare. It was only released in vinyl format.

Track listing

References

The Beatnuts albums
2001 greatest hits albums